Gabriel Oltramare (19 July 1816, Geneva – 10 April 1906, Les Eaux-Vives, quartier, Geneva) was a Swiss mathematician, known for his book "Essai sur le Calcul de Généralisation".

Oltramare studied mathematics and natural sciences in Geneva from 1836 to 1839 and then studied higher mathematics at the Sorbonne, receiving there his licence ès sciences mathématiques in 1840. He was a teacher in Aarau. He was in Egypt from 1843 to 1844 as a tutor for Isma'il, son of Ibrahim Pasha of the Muhammad Ali dynasty. At the Collège de Genève. Oltramare was privat-docent of mechanics from 1845 to 1870 and simultaneously of mathematics from 1848 to 1850. In 1848 he was appointed professor ordinarius of higher mathematics at the University of Geneva. At the beginning of his career he did research on number theory. According to Henri Fehr, the most important of these articles on number theory is the 1855 Note sur les relations qui existent entre les formes linéaires et les formes quadratiques des numbers premiers. Later in his career Oltramare worked on mathematical analysis. In 1893 he published his treatise Essai sur le calcul de généralisation, with 2nd edition in 1899 and a Russian translation in 1895. He published several articles on astronomy and meteorology in scientific journals. He was one of the founders in 1853 of the Institut national genevois and presided from 1894 to 1902 over its section of natural sciences. He was a member in 1848 of the Conseil administratif de Genève and member from 1848 to 1854 of the Grand Conseil de Genève, over which he presided several times. He was one of the organizers of the first International Congress of Mathematicians, which was held in Geneva in 1897.

References

1816 births
1906 deaths
19th-century Swiss mathematicians
College of Sorbonne alumni
Academic staff of the University of Geneva